Weeds is a 1987 American drama film directed by John D. Hancock, and starring Nick Nolte, Ernie Hudson, Lane Smith and Rita Taggart. The screenplay concerns a prison inmate who writes a play that catches the attention of a visiting reporter.

Plot
Lee Umstetter (Nick Nolte) is incarcerated in San Quentin for armed robbery, serving "life without possibility" (with no chance of parole). After two suicide attempts, Lee begins to read books from the prison library. He attends a performance of Waiting for Godot given for the prisoners and is deeply moved. He begins to write plays about imprisonment and then stages them, too.

One is a social-protest musical extravaganza about life in the penitentiary. It attracts visitors and earns Lee the regard of a San Francisco theatre reviewer (Rita Taggart) who persuades the governor to release him.

Lee organises an acting troupe made up of former convicts: a shoplifter (William Forsythe), a murderer (Ernie Hudson), an embezzler (Lane Smith), a pimp (John Toles-Bey), a flasher (Mark Rolston), and others.

Lee's work doesn't make the same impact outside the prison as it did inside. Touring in a camper with no money, the men are torn by impulses to revert to their former criminal behavior.

Reception 
The film received mixed reviews.

Film critic Pauline Kael of The New Yorker observed, "The film is about their efforts to become professional men of the theatre. It's about the ways in which working together changes them and the ways in which it doesn't."

The film had a strong opening weekend, but failed to recoup its costs. The film did well on VHS.

References

External links
 
 
 
 

1987 films
1987 drama films
American prison drama films
Films about theatre
Films about writers
Films directed by John D. Hancock
Films set in San Quentin State Prison
Films shot in North Carolina
1980s prison films
Films scored by Angelo Badalamenti
De Laurentiis Entertainment Group films
1980s English-language films
1980s American films